İvan Tixonov or Ivan Tikhonov (born 21 April 1996) is a Russian-born Azerbaijani artistic gymnast. He has qualified to compete for Azerbaijan at the 2020 Summer Olympics in the men's artistic gymnastics all-around event.

References 

1996 births
Living people
Azerbaijani male artistic gymnasts
Competitors at the 2019 Summer Universiade
Gymnasts at the 2020 Summer Olympics
Olympic gymnasts of Azerbaijan